Cho Jun-ho may refer to:

 Cho Jun-ho (footballer), former South Korean football player and coach
 Cho Jun-ho (judoka), South Korean judoka